Akwaaba Magic is a Ghanaian digital satellite and general entertainment channel. Owned by pay-TV operator M-Net, the 24 hour channel offers a mix of locally produced content for the Ghanaian market ranging from Drama, Telenovela, Comedy, Music, Documentaries as well as Reality Shows. MultiChoice has announced in September 2020 that the channel will roll out on its DStv pay-TV satellite service in 2021.

In February 2021, DStv confirmed that Akwaaba Magic will launch and would be broadcast in high-definition from 9 March 2021.

Programs 

Dede
Inside Out
Rollie and Andy: Magic in Us
Sankofa
Sheroes of Our Time

References

External links
 Official Website

Television stations in Ghana
Television channels and stations established in 2021